Cerbera inflata, commonly known as the cassowary plum, grey milkwood, Joojooga, or rubber tree, is a plant in the family Apocynaceae endemic to north east Queensland, specifically the Atherton Tablelands and adjacent areas.

Description
Leaves are glabrous (smooth),  lanceolate, dull green above and paler below, and crowded towards the end of the twigs. All parts of the tree produces a copious milky sap when cut.

Taxonomy
The species was first described by  S. T. Blake
in 1948 in the Proceedings of the Royal Society of Queensland as Cerbera dilatata. That name was subsequently found to be a nomen illegitimum as it had already been applied to another plant in 1927 and so it was renamed C. inflata in 1959.

Etymology

The species epithet derives from the Latin inflatus, meaning "inflated" and referring to the corolla tube.

Notes on taxa

There is potential confusion regarding the taxon C. dilatata. To clarify, C. dilatata Markgr. was first described in 1927, but has since been determined to be a synonym of C. odollam Gaertn.. C. inflata was originally named C. dilatata  S. T. Blake but was renamed in 1959 due to the earlier usage. Of these three taxa, only C. odollam and C. inflata are now considered legitimate, however there are still many references and sightings labelled with Cerbera dilatata, and any that occur outside Australia are likely to be Cerbera odollam.

Distribution and habitat
Cerbera inflata is endemic to Queensland. It grows in well developed rainforest in the foothills and uplands from  Innisfail to the Atherton Tablelands.

Ecology
 Cassowaries eat the fallen fruit whole, and are the major dispersal agent for the species.

Gallery

References

External links
 
 
 View a map of historical sightings of this species at the Australasian Virtual Herbarium
 View observations of this species on iNaturalist
 View images of this species on Flickriver

inflata
Taxa named by Stanley Thatcher Blake
Plants described in 1948
Endemic flora of Queensland
Trees of Australia